Ashok Chundunsing was the coach of the Mauritius national football team in 1998  and 2007-2008. He was also the coach of the Sunrise Flacq United in the 1990s, where he enjoyed success with several league titles. He was dismissed from the national team in September 2008 following the poor performance of the team and also because of the 5 game suspension  he received for arguing with a referee during the match against Cape Verde. He then accepted the post of coach of Curepipe Starlight SC.

Career statistics

International goals

References

Mauritian football managers
Mauritian footballers
Mauritius national football team managers
Mauritius international footballers
Living people
Year of birth missing (living people)
Association footballers not categorized by position